The 2032 Summer Paralympics, officially the 19th Summer Paralympic Games and commonly known as Brisbane 2032 (Turrbal: Meeanjin 2032), are an upcoming major international multi-sport event for athletes with disabilities governed by the International Paralympic Committee, to be held in Brisbane, Queensland, Australia from 24 August to 5 September 2032. 

It will be the second time that Australia hosts the Summer Paralympics following Sydney 2000.

Bids 

As per agreement between IOC and IPC in 2001, a city which wins the Olympic games host bid will also staged the Paralympic games 16 days after the games.

Organisation
Brisbane Organising Committee for the 2032 Olympic and Paralympic Games was established by the Queensland Government to plan, organise and deliver the Olympic and Paralympic Games in accordance with the host contract".

In November 2022, advocates including Paralympian Karni Liddell raised concerns about Brisbane's preparedness to host the Paralympics in 2032, citing many instances where there was a lack of appropriate accessibility for people with disabilities throughout the city. Liddell implored Games organisers to consult the disability sector to enable the city to become fully accessible to those disabilities. Youngcare Connect manager Shane Jamieson also accused the city of being "completely ill-prepared" to host the Paralympics, stating that future development prior to 2032 would rely on consultation with people with disabilities. Queensland Human Rights Commissioner Scott McDougall said that Queensland was still lagging behind in relation to making public transport fully accessible to those with a disability, with 40% of railway stations in South East Queensland still only accessible by stairs.

The Games

New sports 
In 2021, International Rugby League (IRL) declared an intent to campaign for the inclusion of rugby league in the 2032 Summer Olympics and Paralympics, focusing on wheelchair rugby league for the Paralympics and league nines for the Olympics.

Venues

See also 

 2032 Summer Olympics

References 

 
Summer Paralympic Games
Paralympics
Paralympics
International sports competitions hosted by Australia
Summer Paralympics 2032
Multi-sport events in Australia
Paralympics
Paralympics